The Brothers of the Sun Tour was a co-headlining concert tour by American country music artists Kenny Chesney and Tim McGraw. It took place in 22 cities at 22 venues across the United States. Chesney and McGraw began the tour at Raymond James Stadium in Tampa, Florida on June 2, 2012, and ended it with two shows at Gillette Stadium in Foxboro, Massachusetts on August 25, 2012. The tour grossed over $96 million in ticket sales and drew at least one million in attendance.

Background 
In November 2011, it was announced that country singers Tim McGraw and Kenny Chesney would reunite for a stadium tour throughout North America. The duo had previously toured together as part of the George Strait Country Music Fest in 2001. Following the announcement, it was revealed the tour would feature special guests Grace Potter and the Nocturnals and Jake Owen. Tickets for most dates went on general sale to the public on December 11, 2011.

Set list 

"Felt Good on My Lips"
"For a Little While"
"Down on the Farm"
"Real Good Man"
"Last Dollar (Fly Away)"
"Unbroken"
"Everywhere"
"Where the Green Grass Grows
"Mexicoma"
"All I Want Is a Life"
"Just to See You Smile"
"Better Than I Used to Be"
"Let It Go"
"How Bad Do You Want It"
"Back When"
"Sing Me Back Home" (Merle Haggard cover)
"Something Like That"
"Southern Voice"
"Live Like You Were Dying"
"The Cowboy in Me"
"I Like It, I Love It"
"Truck Yeah"
"Beer In Mexico"
"Keg In The Closet"
"Summertime"
"Reality"
"Live Those Songs"
"No Shoes, No Shirt, No Problems"
"What I Need to Do"
"I Go Back"
"Come Over"
"Anything but Mine"
"You and Tequila" (with Grace Potter)
"Back Where I Come From"
"Living In Fast Forward"
"Young"
"Somewhere with You"
"Never Wanted Nothing More"
"On the Coast of Somewhere Beautiful"
"Out Last Night"
"When The Sun Goes Down"
"Don't Happen Twice"
"The Boys of Fall"
"Feel Like a Rock Star"
"Refried Dreams"
"She Thinks My Tractor's Sexy"
"Indian Outlaw"
"Running on Empty" (Jackson Browne cover)

Tour dates

References

External links 

2012 concert tours
Co-headlining concert tours
Kenny Chesney concert tours
Tim McGraw concert tours